Peter Marinello (born 20 February 1950) is a Scottish former footballer.

Career

Hibernian
Marinello started his career at Hibernian, and could play either as a centre forward or right winger. He was regarded as being talented enough there that he was dubbed "the next George Best" by the British press.

Arsenal
In January 1970, a month before his 20th birthday, he joined Arsenal for £100,000, a club record fee at the time. The acquisition of Marinello also marked the first time that Arsenal had paid a six-figure sum for a player. He went on to score on his debut against Manchester United at Old Trafford on 10 January 1970. However, a combination of a newly adopted 'celebrity party lifestyle' and a knee injury led to a dip in his footballing form and meant that he was not a regular in the team: he was not part of the squad for the final of Arsenal's Inter-Cities Fairs Cup triumph of 1970, but he contributed four appearances during the run, including the semi-final first leg against Ajax. He only played three matches in their 1970–71 Double-winning campaign. He subsequently played eight league matches in 1971–72 and thirteen in 1972–73. In total he played 51 matches for Arsenal, scoring 5 goals. Marinello left Arsenal in July 1973 after failing to agree a new contract.

Later playing career
He next played for Portsmouth followed by Motherwell, Canberra City, Fulham, Phoenix Inferno, Heart of Midlothian and Partick Thistle.

After playing
Though he retired a wealthy man, a failed business venture left him bankrupt in 1994. He now runs an amateur football club and lives in Bournemouth, Dorset. He released an autobiography, Fallen Idle, in 2007.

Honours
Hibernian 
Scottish League Cup: runner-up 1968–69

References

External links 
Statistics on Gunnermania 
Marinello talks to Arseblog.com's 'Arsecast'

1950 births
Living people
Footballers from Edinburgh
Association football wingers
Scottish footballers
Hibernian F.C. players
Arsenal F.C. players
Portsmouth F.C. players
Motherwell F.C. players
Canberra City FC players
Fulham F.C. players
Phoenix Inferno players
Heart of Midlothian F.C. players
Partick Thistle F.C. players
Broxburn Athletic F.C. players
Scottish Football League players
English Football League players
Scottish Junior Football Association players
Major Indoor Soccer League (1978–1992) players
National Soccer League (Australia) players
Scottish Football League representative players
Scotland under-23 international footballers
Scottish expatriate footballers
Expatriate soccer players in Australia
Expatriate soccer players in the United States
Scottish expatriate sportspeople in Australia
Scottish expatriate sportspeople in the United States